Miss Universe Great Britain is a national beauty pageant that selects the British representative in the Miss Universe contest.

History 

When created as Miss Universe Great Britain in 1952, 30 women around the island of Great Britain and Northern Ireland competed. Aileen Chase would be the only contestant to compete at Miss Universe as Miss Great Britain or Miss UK until the 1990s. For four decades there would be no Miss Great Britain nor Miss United Kingdom in Miss Universe pageant.

There was no UK participant at Miss Universe in 1953–1954. From 1955 to 1990 (except 1956), the winner of Miss England competed. Miss Scotland and Miss Wales first competed in 1961 and again, competed every year until 1990, except 1987 in Scotland's case, as that year's Miss Scotland, Eileen Catterson, was disqualified for being under age.

In Miss Universe 1991, Helen Upton, the winner of the 1990 Miss United Kingdom pageant, became the first contestant since 1952, to compete at Miss Universe under the Miss GB or Miss UK banner. She competed as Miss United Kingdom.

In 1992, Tiffany Stanford, Miss British Isles 1992 was appointed to compete as Miss Great Britain.

Then, from 1993 to 1999, the rights to the pageant went to Miss Great Britain pageant. After that, Miss Great Britain Universe came back in 2000. There was no British representative at Miss Universe from 2001 to 2004.

In 2005 it came back with the name Miss Universe United Kingdom and the pageant had 30 delegates representing subdivision of British Overseas, Crown Dependencies, England, Northern Ireland, Scotland, and Wales.

In 2008 the rights to the pageant were awarded to Welsh Modelling agency Vibe Models, and the name was changed again to Miss Universe UK. The contest was revitalized, with a show being held in Central London to determine the winner; 38 contestants competed for the title.

In 2009 the name of the pageant was changed once again to Miss Universe Great Britain and has since kept the name until 2020. The event is now held at the Birmingham ICC.

In 2010, Miss Universe Great Britain took on new sponsors Front Agency in London.

In 2018, Dee-Ann Kentish-Rogers from Anguilla, a British Overseas Territory, won the crown. She is a past Commonwealth Games heptathlete and a barrister at law.

Gallery of winners

Titleholders

The following is a list of winners of Miss Universe Great Britain. From 1952 to present.

Titleholders under Miss Universe Great Britain org.

Miss Universe Great Britain

The winner of Miss Universe Great Britain represents the country at Miss Universe. On occasion, when the winner does not qualify (due to age) a runner-up is sent.

References

External links 

 Miss Universe UK official website

 
UK
Recurring events established in 1952
1952 establishments in the United Kingdom
Annual events in the United Kingdom
British awards
Great Britain